Hacıbədəlli (also, Hacıbadəlli, Gadzhibedelli, and Gadzhybedelli) is a village and municipality in the Aghjabadi Rayon of Azerbaijan.  It has a population of 3,148.

References 

Populated places in Aghjabadi District